Küstendorf also known as Drvengrad and Mećavnik, is a traditional village that the Serbian film director Emir Kusturica built for his film Life Is a Miracle from 2003 to 2004. It is located near the village of Mokra Gora in western Serbia, in the administrative area of Užice. Kusturica was the 2005 recipient of the Philippe Rotthier European Architecture award.

The idea 
Emir Kusturica stated:

Village 

Küstendorf is a word play on German "dorf" (village) and Kusturica's nickname, "Kusta". Also, "Küste" is German for coast. Kusturica has also been known to call it Mećavnik, which is the name of the neighbouring village.

Küstendorf has a library, named the Ivo Andrić Library and an artist gallery named Macola in honor of sculptor Dragan Jovićević (it was previously known as  Anika, after a character from Ivo Andrić's prose).

There is the Stanley Kubrick Theater, a sports hall, a restaurant, a cake shop, as well as a souvenir shop and finally. The main house, which houses a cinema-hall in the cellar, a living room, a guest room, a closed yard, a swimming pool, a gymnasium, a sauna and private rooms for the Kusturica family. The middle of the village marks the Serbian-Orthodox Church dedicated to Holy Sava.

Nearby is also a ski slope with four trails, as well as a hotel named Mladost ("Youth").

The streets in the village bear the names of various individuals that Kusturica holds in high esteem or finds to be personally significant: Nikola Tesla, Ernesto "Che" Guevara, Diego Maradona, Miodrag Petrović Čkalja, Federico Fellini, Ingmar Bergman, Joe Strummer, Novak Djokovic, and Ivo Andrić, after whom the main street is named.

Film and music festival 
Since 2008, the village hosts the annual Küstendorf Film and Music Festival, which showcases films and music from all around the world. The festival is known for not having a red carpet as well as none of the popular Hollywood festival artifacts.

In 2010, it was visited by actor Johnny Depp. During his visit, a statue dedicated to him was unveiled.

Due to the COVID-19 pandemic the festival wasn't hosted in the year 2021. The festival was held in 2022 from May 6 until May 10.

Gallery

See also 
 Andrićgrad, another town built by Emir Kusturica, located in Višegrad, Republika Srpska, Bosnia and Herzegovina.

References

External links

The Official website of Küstendorf
The Official website of the Küstendorf Film & Music Festival

New towns started in the 2000s
Populated places in Serbia
Open-air museums in Serbia
New Classical architecture
 
New towns
Zlatibor